Hofaschenbach is a small village in Fulda district in the German state of Hesse. It is the seat of Nüsttal municipality.

Villages in Hesse